Abdullahpur is a village situated in the Pind Dadan Khan Tehsil Jhelum District of Punjab, Pakistan. Its geographical coordinates are 32° 38' 0" North, 73° 19' 0" East. It is situated near River Jhelum.

All of the population is Muslim, and belongs to the Aurah Jatt,
Hashmi Syed,Phaphra Jatt, and some family of Lohare, Bhatti and Musalli.

References 

Populated places in Jhelum District